Rentaghost is a British children's television comedy show, originally broadcast by the BBC between 6 January 1976 and 6 November 1984. The show's plot centred on the antics of a number of ghosts who worked for a firm called Rentaghost, which hired out the spirits for various tasks.

Background
The firm, located in South Ealing, is originally run by Fred Mumford, a recently deceased loser who feels he can find work for ghosts whose lives were as unsuccessful as his. His first (and only) recruits are Timothy Claypole, a mischievous jester with a comical lack of knowledge about modern technology, and Hubert Davenport, a delicate Victorian-era gentleman who is morally shocked by the modern world. The ghosts work from an office, which they rent from Harold Meaker, who discovers the truth about them in the third episode.

Over the course of several series, other characters were added: Hazel the McWitch, a Scottish witch; Nadia Popov, a Dutch ghost who suffers from hay fever and teleports away when she sneezes; and the pantomime horse Dobbin, who first appears in a one-off Christmas special called Rentasanta and is brought to life by Claypole, who is unable to cancel the spell afterwards, thus allowing Dobbin to remain in the show for the rest of the run.

Another key figure is a ghost from the Wild West called Catastrophe Kate (cf. Calamity Jane), played by Jana Shelden, who is collected from outside a magic carpet shop in the Spirit World by Fred Mumford. The two ghosts are transported back to Earth on a flying broomstick, Catastrophe Kate having turned down the alternative of a flying vacuum cleaner.  Catastrophe Kate later introduces Hazel the McWitch to the regulars.

Adam Painting, a local entrepreneur played by Christopher Biggins, frequently appears in episodes, and tries, with limited success, to involve the ghosts in his latest business enterprise.

When actor Michael Darbyshire (who played the role of Davenport) died in 1979, Anthony Jackson (Mumford) declined to appear in the next series, leaving Michael Staniforth's Claypole the sole original ghost. Davenport and Mumford's absences were explained at the start of the series by the pair having gone on an extended tour of stately home hauntings. After Mumford's departure, the business was taken over by Harold Meaker and his wife Ethel, who suffered from the various problems the ghosts brought to their lives.

The long-suffering neighbours of Rentaghost are the Perkinses, who appear from series four onwards and think the Meakers are mad.

Episodes

Releases 
Only the first series of Rentaghost was released on VHS and DVD, with rights issues holding up further release. However, the first two series were made available digitally via the BBC Store.

Some master copies of Rentaghost episodes and other children's shows were wiped by the BBC in 1993 on the assumption that they were no use and that examples of some other episodes were sufficient. The wiped tapes were then sold overseas to countries that still used obsolete, in the UK at least, tape formats. However, BBC Enterprises had requested copies of the first three series a couple of years earlier and they were showing at the time on UK Gold; these were later recovered by the BBC Archives.

The first two series and series nine is currently available through the UK BritBox service as part of their "Back To School" section.  Britbox is a  subscription online TV service run by BBC and ITV.

Regular cast
Anthony Jackson - Fred Mumford (1976–1978)
Michael Darbyshire - Hubert Davenport (1976–1978)
Michael Staniforth - Timothy Claypole (1976–1984)
Betty Alberge - Mrs Sheila Mumford (1976–1978)
John Dawson - Mr Phil Mumford (1976–1978)
Edward Brayshaw - Harold Meaker (1976–1984)
Ann Emery - Ethel Meaker (1976–1984)
Christopher Biggins - Adam Painting (1977–1984)
Molly Weir - Hazel the McWitch (1978–1984)
Hal Dyer - Rose Perkins (1978–1984)
Jeffrey Segal - Arthur Perkins (1978–1984)
William Perrie and John Asquith - Dobbin the Pantomime Horse (1978–1984)
Lynda Marchal - Tamara Novek (1980)
Sue Nicholls - Nadia Popov (1981–1984)
Kenneth Connor - Whatsisname Smith (1983–1984)
Aimi MacDonald - Susie Starlight (1984)
 (Vincent White) - Bernie St. John (1984)

Remakes
A pilot for an Australian version of the series was filmed in 1989, five years after the end of the original series, and in keeping with other BBC series such as Are You Being Served which had been adapted for Australian versions. The producers had originally wanted Michael Staniforth to reprise his role as Mister Claypole, the unofficial 'lead' of the original series, but Staniforth had died two years prior.

The pilot, which followed a similar plot to the first two episodes of the original Rentaghost but with some of the more pantomime-like humour of later years, was set in a derelict old office in Victoria due for destruction, where the Rentaghost team had set up their business, beginning a planned story arc for the first series in which the Rentaghost team must scare off building developers to save their office/home. A young Lisa McCune played Julia, a character who visits the agency mistakenly believing them to be living people who can exorcise her haunted apartment, and ends up working as their secretary after they help her chase her poltergeist away anyway. However the pilot did not sell, with some concerns over appropriateness of dark tone of the series aimed at young children, and plans for the series were cancelled.

In September 2008, it was reported that the show could be returning to television after the rights to the programme were obtained by the UK production company RDF. However, no new show was forthcoming.

Deadline reported in December 2010 that "Warner Bros had acquired the rights to RentaGhost and was going to develop it into a Beetlejuice-style afterlife feature comedy vehicle for Russell Brand as Fred Mumford." However, in October 2011, it was reported that Ben Stiller had now been signed for the project. Night at the Museum writers Tom Lennon and Robert Ben Garant had been hired to write the script, reuniting the two writers with Stiller.

See also
 List of ghost films

References

External links

British Film Institute Screen Online
Rentaghost the Musical
Rentaghost Fansite (via Wayback Archive)
Rentaghost: from worst to best

1976 British television series debuts
1984 British television series endings
1970s British sitcoms
1980s British sitcoms
BBC television sitcoms
BBC children's television shows
British supernatural television shows
English-language television shows
Ghosts in television
Television shows set in London
1970s British children's television series
1980s British children's television series